David Stanley Norris  (born 14 December 1939) is a former New Zealand athlete who specialised in the long jump and triple jump.

Norris competed at five British Empire and Commonwealth Games from 1958 to 1974. At the 1962 British Empire and Commonwealth Games he won the silver medal in the men's long jump. At the 1958 British Empire and Commonwealth Games in Cardiff he had won the bronze medal in the triple jump. At the 1960 Summer Olympics he competed in both the long jump and triple jump. Norris won a total of 28 national titles and broke 11 records in jumping and hurdling events over his career.

After retiring from competitive athletics in 1978 he worked as a coach and a school principal. He was chief executive of North Harbour Basketball in Auckland for a time, and he was part of a dedicated team who, lead by Sir Graeme Avery, created the Millennium Institute of Sport and Health on Auckland's North Shore. In the 2002 Queen's Birthday and Golden Jubilee Honours, Norris was appointed an Officer of the New Zealand Order of Merit, for services to athletics and the community.

References

1939 births
Living people
New Zealand male long jumpers
Olympic athletes of New Zealand
Athletes (track and field) at the 1958 British Empire and Commonwealth Games
Athletes (track and field) at the 1962 British Empire and Commonwealth Games
Athletes (track and field) at the 1966 British Empire and Commonwealth Games
Athletes (track and field) at the 1970 British Commonwealth Games
Athletes (track and field) at the 1974 British Commonwealth Games
Commonwealth Games silver medallists for New Zealand
Commonwealth Games bronze medallists for New Zealand
Commonwealth Games medallists in athletics
Officers of the New Zealand Order of Merit
Athletes (track and field) at the 1960 Summer Olympics
20th-century New Zealand people
21st-century New Zealand people
Medallists at the 1958 British Empire and Commonwealth Games
Medallists at the 1962 British Empire and Commonwealth Games